Menelaus Ridge is a snow-covered ridge having four small summits at about , between Mount Agamemnon and Mount Helen in the Achaean Range of central Anvers Island, in the Palmer Archipelago, Antarctica. It was surveyed in 1955 by the Falkland Islands Dependencies Survey, and was named by the UK Antarctic Place-Names Committee, in association with other names in the area, for Menelaus, husband of Helen and younger brother of Agamemnon in Homer's Iliad.

References

Ridges of Graham Land
Landforms of the Palmer Archipelago